Fabian Norsten (born 11 July 2000) is a Swedish handball player for VfL Gummersbach and the Swedish national team.

Achievements 
Individual awards
 All-Star Team as Best goalkeeper at the 2018 European U-18 Championship

References 

2000 births
Living people
Swedish male handball players

Hammarby IF Handboll players
IFK Skövde players
VfL Gummersbach players
Handball-Bundesliga players
Swedish expatriate sportspeople in Germany
21st-century Swedish people